Candelon is a French surname. Notable people with the surname include:

Henri Candelon, French modern pentathlete
Julien Candelon (born 1980), French rugby union footballer

French-language surnames